Julia Varela Ruano (born 30 June 1981) is a Spanish television and radio presenter, newsreader, reporter and director.

Biography 
After graduating in journalism at the Complutense University of Madrid, Varela began her professional career at RTVE in 2005 in RNE's news department as a newsreader for Radio Exterior de España. In 2008, she moved to RNE Radio 3 to work as a presenter and editor in music programmes like Siglo 21, 180 Grados or Los Conciertos de Radio 3, and in the broadcast of different music festivals. 

Since 2013, Varela has worked as a TV reporter for TVE in shows like Comando Actualidad and La mañana de La 1; in the latter she was also the commentator of the show business section. From July 2019 to March 2020, Varela co-directed the daytime talk show A partir de hoy.

Since 2015, Varela is TVE's commentator for the Eurovision Song Contest: in 2015, 2016 and 2017 alongside José María Íñigo, and in 2018, 2019, 2021 and 2022 alongside Tony Aguilar. Varela and Íñigo also provided the Spanish commentary for Eurovision Song Contest's Greatest Hits, the show that commemorated the Eurovision Song Contest's 60th anniversary, and Varela and Aguilar provided the commentary for the 2019 and 2021 Junior contests. In 2016, Varela was the green room host during Objetivo Eurovisión, the national final that selected the Spanish entry for the 2016 Contest.

In 2019, Varela authored her first novel, titled ¿Por qué me pido un gin tonic si no me gusta?.

References

External links 
 

1981 births
Living people
People from Pontevedra
Spanish television presenters
Spanish radio presenters
Spanish journalists
Spanish women journalists
Spanish women radio presenters
Spanish women television presenters